Clitheroe railway station serves the town of Clitheroe in Lancashire, England. The station forms part of Clitheroe Interchange, which has won a number of awards.

History 
The original station opened on 22 June 1850. The station closed to normal services on 10 September 1962 (that is, before the Beeching cuts) but remained in use for special services until 7 February 1971. The special services resumed on 14 May 1990, and the station was fully reopened on 29 May 1994, when passenger services began again from Blackburn.

The line from here continues northwards towards , but this section is normally used only by freight and engineering trains on weekdays; passenger services are limited to a pair of Sundays only Dalesrail charter trains and occasional railtours. It has also been used in emergency for unplanned work between these locations. Terminating trains from the Blackburn direction run empty up to Horrocksford Junction to the north (where the former Ribble Cement (now Hansons) factory branch diverges from the main line) and use the crossover there to reverse and change lines prior to returning to the station.

The station has since become an award-winning bus and train transport interchange. The Ribble Valley Line is a community railway line and is supervised by the Ribble Valley Rail group, which includes the train operator Northern.

Facilities
The station had a ticket office, which was next to the old station building (which is used as an art gallery). The ticket office, operated by Lancashire County Council rather than operator Northern permanently closed from February 2020. It was staffed Monday to Friday. All tickets must now be purchased via mobile device or from the ticket machine on Platform 1. There are waiting shelters on both platforms (which are offset from each other) and train running details are provided via digital screens, signage, customer help points and automatic announcements. Step-free access is available on both sides.

Services
All train services are operated by Northern Trains. There is generally an hourly service daily from Clitheroe to  via Blackburn and Manchester Victoria with some extra trains during weekday peak hours.
Northern used to operate a variety of train types on the route, including Class 142 units but now Northern only operate a variety of Sprinter trains, including Class 150, Class 153, Class 156, Class 158 units.

For much of 2017 and 2018, Saturday and Sunday services to Manchester have either been partially replaced by buses south of Bolton or diverted via  and  due to the Manchester to Preston Line being closed for electrification work.

On Sundays, one or two trains operate from Preston along the Ribble Valley Line via Clitheroe to Hellifield and onwards towards  via the Settle-Carlisle Line. This improves on the previous service that only ran in the summer.

Due to overcrowding at certain times, there are plans from the Department for Transport to increase services from 1 tph to 2 tph; however, the funding for this may not be available.

Notes

References 

 Welch, M.S. (2004) Lancashire Steam Finale, Runpast Publishing, Cheltenham,

External links

Clitheroe Interchange - Lancashire County Council Environmental Directorate 
Ribble Valley Rail official website
Video of Clitheroe Railway Station

Clitheroe
Railway stations in Ribble Valley
DfT Category F2 stations
Former Lancashire and Yorkshire Railway stations
Railway stations in Great Britain opened in 1850
Railway stations in Great Britain closed in 1962
Railway stations in Great Britain opened in 1994
Reopened railway stations in Great Britain
Northern franchise railway stations